Infinite Arms is the third album of indie rock band Band of Horses, released on May 18, 2010, on Brown Records, Fat Possum Records and Columbia. Most of the album was recorded in Asheville, North Carolina with some overdubbing done in Los Angeles. The album was nominated for a Grammy Award in the Best Alternative Album category.

History
Shortly after the release of Cease to Begin, keyboard player Ryan Monroe was made a permanent band member. The line-up was further expanded by the addition of Tyler Ramsey (guitar) and Bill Reynolds (bass). The new six piece band toured extensively between the releases of Cease to Begin and Infinite Arms, although Rob Hampton left the band prior to the recording of Infinite Arms.

Infinite Arms was made without assistance or funding from a record label, the band having left Sub Pop. Ben Bridwell explained why he eventually decided to have Brown Records, his own label, involved, "Because I did fund the record myself and (we) produced it ourselves, we just really wanted to make sure that we can have our hands in the pie." Several of the tracks were written by Ben Bridwell whilst staying in a cabin in Minnesota near the Canada–US border.

Bridwell explained why he had said that this was the "first" Band of Horses album, "It's the first time the line-up hasn't been this revolving door. With this record it's a real band that I'm part of. No one's going anywhere, everyone's contributing to the songwriting process..."

The track "Blue Beard" features drums by Bridwell, the first time he has played drums on a record since he was in Carissa's Wierd, Bridwell explained, "I didn’t even mean to be playing drums on that song. We all took a stab at it. The song wasn’t developing right. I was the last one to go for it and it ended up being the one." "Evening Kitchen" was written by guitarist Tyler Ramsey and features him sharing lead vocals with Bridwell, while "Older" is written and sung by keyboard player Ryan Monroe. The first single taken from the album is "Compliments" and its official music video was presented on the band's website in April 2010.

Critical reception

Reviews of the album have been generally favourable, it has an overall rating of 69 out of 100 from 31 reviews, on the Metacritic website. Q magazine gave Infinite Arms a 4/5 rating and described it as "The next Great Americana Album." They noted the influence of Neil Young and drew parallels with "The Great American Novel" in literature. Q concluded by saying that, "For all the restlessness of the creative process...this is a strangely domestic affair."

Commercial performance
Infinite Arms proved a major international success for Band of Horses, performing well in charts in Europe, Australasia and North America, reaching the top 10 in the US, Canada, Denmark, Greece, Norway and Sweden.

The album sold 73,000 units in first three weeks in United States. As of September 2012, the album has sold 202,000 copies in United States.

Track listing

Personnel
Benjamin Bridwell - vocals, guitars, drums, sounds, memotron
Creighton Barret - drums, thunderdrum, percussion
Ryan Monroe - keyboards, vocals, percussion, guitar
Bill Reynolds - bass, tambourine, guitar, percussion, sounds
Tyler Ramsey - guitar, vocals, percussion, keyboards, piano, theremin

Guest musicians
Jay Widenhouse - trumpet on "Factory"
Dylan Huber - trumpet #2 on "Factory"
Dave Wilkens - trombone on "Factory"
Clint Fore - tuba on "Factory"
Lauren Brown - strings on "Factory"

Production
Band of Horses - production 
Phil Ek - additional production 
Dave Sardy - mixing

Charts

References

External links
Band of Horses official website

2010 albums
Band of Horses albums
Albums produced by Phil Ek
Fat Possum Records albums
Columbia Records albums